Tomáš Berdych and Dmitry Tursunov are the defending champions. They are both present but do not compete together.
Berdych partners with Jürgen Melzer, but lost in the semifinals to Daniel Nestor and Nenad Zimonjić.
Tursunov partnered with Gilles Simon, but lost in the first round to Daniel Nestor and Nenad Zimonjić.

Seeds

Draw

Draw

External links
 2009 ABN AMRO World Tennis Tournament Main Doubles Draw

Doubles